Echthrocollix is a genus of moths in the family Geometridae.

Species
 Echthrocollix minuta (Butler, 1881)

References
 Echthrocollix at Markku Savela's Lepidoptera and Some Other Life Forms
 Natural History Museum Lepidoptera genus database

Melanthiini
Geometridae genera